Conasprella centurio is a species of sea snail, a marine gastropod mollusk in the family Conidae, the cone snails and their allies.

Like all species within the genus Conasprella, thesecone snails are predatory and venomous. They are capable of "stinging" humans, therefore live ones should be handled carefully or not at all.

Distribution
Locus typicus: (designated by Clench) - Puerto Plata, Santo Domingo,
(Dominican Republic).

A Western Atlantic species known from the continental shelf of Guyana
and Northern South America and from Monos Isl. Trinidad, 
also from St.Vincent and Barbados, in the Lesser Antilles.

Description 
The maximum recorded shell length is 85.5 mm.

Habitat 
Minimum recorded depth is 2 m. Maximum recorded depth is 175 m.

References

 Tucker J.K. & Tenorio M.J. (2013) Illustrated catalog of the living cone shells. 517 pp. Wellington, Florida: MdM Publishing
  Puillandre N., Duda T.F., Meyer C., Olivera B.M. & Bouchet P. (2015). One, four or 100 genera? A new classification of the cone snails. Journal of Molluscan Studies. 81: 1–23

External links
 The Conus Biodiversity website
  Cone Shells – Knights of the Sea
 

centurio
Gastropods described in 1778
Taxa named by Ignaz von Born